Colliery Stadium is a multi purpose stadium in Birsinghpur, Madhya Pradesh, India. The ground is mainly used for organizing matches of football, cricket and other sports.

The stadium hosted four first-class matches  from 1967 when Madhya Pradesh cricket team played against Vidarbha cricket team. until 1987 but since then the stadium has hosted non first-class cricket matches.

References

External links 
 cricketarchive
 cricinfo

Cricket grounds in Madhya Pradesh
Sports venues in Madhya Pradesh
Sports venues completed in 1967
1967 establishments in Madhya Pradesh
Satna district
20th-century architecture in India